Herb Meadow (May 27, 1911 – March 1, 1995) was an American television producer and writer, born 1911 in Brooklyn, New York, best known for creating such series as Have Gun – Will Travel.

Early years 
Meadow grew up in Brooklyn. A ninth-grade school dropout, he was a runner for a gangster and bootlegger during the prohibition era in addition to selling sheet music and jewelry and working at an art supply business.

Career
When he was in his 20s, Meadow worked in radio in New York. In 1933, he became an actor, announcer, and writer at WCNW in New York. He later became a writer in the old-time radio era, creating 350 scripts for the soap opera Valiant Lady.

Meadow worked in Hollywood for more than 50 years. At age 83, he was still active, writing a screenplay that resulted in a $500,000 contract. He wrote at least 37 feature-length film scripts, of which a dozen were produced, including The Redhead from Wyoming, The Strange Woman, Stranger on Horseback, and The Unguarded Moment.

On television, in addition to Have Gun – Will Travel, Meadow created and wrote for The Man from Blackhawk and developed the Arrest and Trial series.

Despite his many scripts, he would write only one book,  Uncertain Glory, a novelization of the screenplay by László Vadnay & Max Brand from the screenstory by Brand and Joe May (Grosset and Dunlap, 1944).

Personal life 
Meadow was married twice. His first wife died in 1980, ending their 43-year marriage. His second marriage ended in divorce after six years, but the two continued to cohabit.

Death
Meadow died of a heart attack in 1995 in Los Angeles.

References

External links

American television writers
American male television writers
American television producers
1911 births
1995 deaths
20th-century American businesspeople
American radio writers
Writers from Brooklyn
20th-century American screenwriters
20th-century American male writers